Zalambdalestidae is a clade of Asian eutherians occurring during the Late Cretaceous. Once classified as Glires, features like epipubic bones and various cranial elements have identified these animals as outside of Placentalia, representing thus a specialised clade of non-placental eutherians without any living descendants, and potentially rather different from modern placentals in at least reproductive anatomy.

Taxonomy
The exact position of Zalambdalestidae within Eutheria varies, though they are generally agreed to be more basal than zhelestids. Currently, the clade includes the genera Zalambdalestes, Alymlestes, Anchilestes, Barunlestes, Kulbeckia, Zhangolestes and Zofialestes.

Palaeobiology
Zalambdaltestids were insectivores, having zalambdodont molars much as various modern insectivorous species. They are uniquely suited to a saltatorial, cursorial lifestyle, bearing long, semi-digitigrade limbs and a spinal column similar to that of modern lagomorphs. Like most non-placental mammals, the presence of epipubic bones probably meant that they gave birth to poorly developed young much like modern marsupials and monotremes.

References

Prehistoric eutherians
Natural history of Mongolia
Late Cretaceous mammals of Asia
Djadochta fauna
Prehistoric mammal families